= Cunji =

Cunji may refer to,

- Cunji, Guinea-Bissau, place in West Africa
- Tunicate, various sea squirt species known as cunji in Australia
